Zhuang is the pinyin romanization of the Chinese surname written  in simplified character and  in traditional character. It's usually romanized as "Chuang" in Taiwan based in Wade-Giles. It is spoken in the first tone: Zhuāng.

Zhuang is listed 323rd in the Song dynasty classic text Hundred Family Surnames. As of 2008, it is the 113th most common surname in China, shared by 1.6 million people.

Romanizations
Zhuang is romanized as Chuang in the Wade-Giles system is usually employed in Taiwan and among the Chinese diaspora. It is romanized Chong in Cantonese; Chng, Tsng, or Ching in Hokkien.

In Thai, it is written as จึง.

Distribution
As of 2008, Zhuang is the 113th most common surname in mainland China, shared by 1.6 million people. It has been ranked the 24th-most-common surname on Taiwan.

Zhuang is a rather uncommon name in the United States. It was ranked 53,245th during the 1990 census and 31,703rd during the year 2000 one. Chuang is more common, having been ranked 24,816th in 1990 and 11,621st in 2000. The variant spellings Chong, Ching, and Tong are all much more common, but include other Chinese surnames as well.

History
The pronunciation of  has been reconstructed as  *tsraŋ in Old Chinese and Tsrjang in Middle Chinese; its original meaning was "dignified" and "grave".

As with many Chinese surnames, the current bearers come from a variety of origins, some legendary.

The Manuscript of the Words and Deeds of Virtuous Clans claimed that the first Zhuangs were descended from King Zhuang of Chu.

Another group descended from Duke Dai of Song, who was also known as Zhuang.

During the Warring States period, the general Zhuang Qiao (庄跤) of Chu attacked Shu but was blocked from returning home by Qin troops. He proclaimed himself king of Dian. A third group were the subjects of this realm.

All three groups found themselves bound to change their names to Yan upon the ascension of the Han Ming Emperor, whose personal name was Zhuang, owing to the naming taboo. Most did change back to Zhuang during the Northern and Southern dynasties era after Han dynasty but many still remain as Yan until today. 

By the period of the Sixteen States, however, the Zhuangs had spread from Lianghu to other regions such as Shandong, Gansu, Zhejiang, and Fujian.

Notable people with the surname

Zhuangzi or Chuang Tzu, Taoist philosopher
Zhuang Chuo, a Song-era writer
Zhuang Cunyu, Confucian scholar
Zhuang Datian, leader of a peasant rebellion
Zhuang Ji, a Han-era writer and critic
Zhuang Jia (Qi), a Qi official executed for insubordination
Zhuang Jia (rebel), assassin of Chen Sheng
Zhuang Qiao, Chu general and king of Dian
Zhuang Tinglong, scholar imprisoned for completing the History of the Ming Dynasty
Xiaowei Zhuang
Chuang Che, a Chinese artist
Zhuang Zedong, world table tennis champion
JJ Zhuang, tech entrepreneur and computer programmer
Zhuang Kezhu, lieutenant general of the PLA Air Force

References

Chinese-language surnames

Individual Chinese surnames